PTJ may refer to:

 Cuerpo Tecnico de Policia Judicial,  Venezuela'a national police agency until 2001
Impetigore, also known as Perempuan Tanah Jahanam (PTJ), a 2019 Indonesian folk horror film
 Passenger Train Journal, an American magazine about passenger railways and urban rail transit
 Paul Tudor Jones
 Portland Airport (Victoria), IATA code
 Protivteroristička jedinica, the Serbian name of Counter-Terrorist Unit (Serbia)